The A2199 is an urban A-road in south London. It runs from the A215 Norwood Road, in the centre of Herne Hill, to the A212 Crystal Palace Parade.

Herne Hill 
The A2199 commences its journey on the A215 Norwood Road, opposite Brockwell Park. Starting as Croxted Road, it heads south, forming a boundary between the London Borough of Lambeth, to the west, and the London Borough of Southwark, to the east. In this section, Lambeth is the dominant borough. It immediately comes under a bridge, carrying the Herne Hill and Tulse Hill Line and then afterwards bending to the right. We pass a petrol garage, quickly followed by passing under another bridge, this time the Sutton and Mole Valley Line, and comes to a crossroads with Turney Road. It continues straight, eventually arriving to a junction with the A205 Thurlow Park Road (South Circular Road), near to West Dulwich Station.

West Dulwich 
Here the road continues straight, with Southwark winning the battle, and stays dominant for the rest of the route. The road passes blocks of flats, until it reaches a parade of shops, in the centre of West Dulwich. Here, it reaches a junction, with Park Hall Road, where it continues straight, changing its name to South Croxted Road. It follows this Victorian terraced street until a couple of bends, which takes it to a large roundabout.

Arterial route
It is the main north–south arterial road for West Dulwich

Crystal Palace 
At the roundabout, the A2199 takes the first exit onto Dulwich Wood Park. About  later, Dulwich Wood Park meets Kingswood Drive at a mini roundabout. Again, we continue straight, passing a zebra crossing, and then becoming a dual-carriageway, up a hill.

References 

Roads in London